So Unreal is the debut album by Rotterdam based singer-songwriter iET.

The album was released in three phases, first in the Netherlands on February 21, secondly in Japan on March 26 and then worldwide on June 9, 2014.

Critical reception 

So Unreal has received generally positive reviews from music critics. Karma Bertelsen at Music Week called the album "vivacious", adding that "the album boasts a musical kaleidoscope, whilst still managing to maintain its accessibility and ease of listening". Erwin Zijlemanone of the popular blog Indie Fuzz called iET "one of the most impressive and expressive neo-soul singers I’ve heard in quite a while", adding that "producer Russell Elevado brings out the best in her". Joost Festen of 8weekly Magazine said "'So Unreal sounds mature and is irresistible", and Veronica Magazine said "So Unreal is close to magic".

Track listing

Personnel 

 Budy Mokoginta - Electric Guitar, and all additional instruments
 Jorrijn Mette de Jonge - Logo Design
 Hugo den Oudsten - Bass
 Lisa Van Viegen - Vocals, Acoustic Guitar, Trumpet
 Optimus - Turntables
 Salle de Jonge – Drums 
 Russell Elevado - Production, Mixing, Mastering
 Ingrid Baars - Artwork

References

2014 albums